Aubrey Michelle Logan (born January 16, 1988) is an American pop and jazz singer and trombone soloist. Logan won the Audience's Choice Award and the Jury's First Place Award at the 2009 Shure-Montreux Jazz Festival in Switzerland. She was also an American Idol in 2009, but was eliminated in the early rounds. She is a featured artist for Postmodern Jukebox, and the Dave Koz band.

Background
The daughter of music teachers, Logan was a singer, dancer and actress. Attending a new middle school, she found that her new friends had a different lunch period because they were in the band program.  Eventually, Logan told her mother that she wasn't enjoying school and her mother approached the school's band director. When the band director asked what instrument she played, the answer was, "Nothing, but she sings and can read music."  Logan was accepted, as long as she agreed not to choose the flute as her instrument. She enjoyed bands with brass sections like the James Brown Band and Chicago, and having no interest in the flute, she chose the trombone.

Logan graduated from the Berklee College of Music in 2010. The same year, she married fellow alumnus Chris Knight.

Discography

As primary artist

As featured artist

References

External links

1988 births
Living people
People from Bellevue, Washington
Singer-songwriters from Washington (state)
American women jazz singers
American jazz singers
American women pop singers
American women singer-songwriters
Berklee College of Music alumni
American jazz trombonists
21st-century trombonists
21st-century American women singers
21st-century American singers
Women trombonists
Jazz musicians from Washington (state)
American Idol participants